, also called Torasan and a Paper Balloon in some regions, is a 1981 Japanese comedy film directed by Yoji Yamada. It stars Kiyoshi Atsumi as Torajirō Kuruma (Tora-san), and Mikiko Otonashi as his love interest or "Madonna". Tora-san's Promise is the twenty-eighth entry in the popular, long-running Otoko wa Tsurai yo series.

Synopsis
Tora-san returns to his family's home to attend an elementary school class reunion. After he embarrasses himself by getting drunk and insulting all his ex-classmates, he resumes his travels. In Kyushu he meets an outspoken 18-year-old girl who becomes enamored of Tora-san and follows him around. One of Tora-san's old friends is terminally ill and makes Tora-san promise him to marry his wife once he is gone.

Cast
 Kiyoshi Atsumi as Torajirō
 Chieko Baisho as Sakura
 Mikiko Otonashi as Mitsue Kuratomi
 Kayoko Kishimoto as Aiko Odajima
 Shimojo Masami as Kuruma Tatsuzō
 Chieko Misaki as Tsune Kuruma (Torajiro's aunt)
 Hiroshi Inuzuka as Shigeru
 Gin Maeda as Hiroshi Suwa
 Takeo Chii as Kenkichi Odajima
 Hidetaka Yoshioka as Mitsuo Suwa
 Hisao Dazai as Boss (Umetarō Katsura)

Critical appraisal
Stuart Galbraith IV writes that Tora-san's Promise is a middle-quality entry in the Otoko wa Tsurai yo series, though the series has a high standard. The German-language site molodezhnaja gives Tora-san's Promise three and a half out of five stars.

Availability
Tora-san's Promise was released theatrically on December 28, 1981. In Japan, the film was released on videotape in 1986 and 1996, and in DVD format in 2002 and 2008.

References

Bibliography

English

German

Japanese

External links
 Tora-san's Promise at www.tora-san.jp (official site)

1981 films
Films directed by Yoji Yamada
1981 comedy films
1980s Japanese-language films
Otoko wa Tsurai yo films
Japanese sequel films
Shochiku films
Films with screenplays by Yôji Yamada
1980s Japanese films